Sadako Ruth Pointer Johnson (born March 24, 1984), known professionally as Sadako Pointer, is an American singer.

Biography
Born in 1984, Sadako Pointer is the granddaughter of Ruth Pointer of the Pointer Sisters. She grew up in New York City and Los Angeles, California, and is of Japanese and African American descent. Sadako tours with The Pointer Sisters, with Ruth and aunt Issa Pointer, and appeared in the 2014 film Proxy.

References

Living people
1984 births
Sadako
21st-century American singers
21st-century American women singers
The Pointer Sisters members
African-American women musicians
American musicians of Japanese descent
21st-century African-American women singers
20th-century African-American people
20th-century African-American women